Alanorites is a genus of beetles in the family Carabidae, containing the following species:

 Alanorites enigmaticus Belousov, 1998
 Alanorites labensis Belousov, 1998
 Alanorites teberdensis Belousov, 1998

References

Trechinae